Play Dead (also known as Killer Dog and Satan's Dog) is a 1981 American horror film directed by Peter Wittman and starring Yvonne De Carlo.

Plot
Hester (De Carlo) is a wealthy heiress who was jilted years ago by her lover to marry her sister. Using her weapon of choice, a 200 lb. Rottweiler, Hester not only exacts her revenge on her sister and lover, but has now set her sights on the offspring of the ill-fated reunion.

Production and release
Although the film was shot in 1981, it was not released until 1986.

Reception
"If you’re an aficionado of crap cinema (like I am), you may want to check out Play Dead."

References

External links

Films about dogs
1981 films
1981 horror films
American independent films
Troma Entertainment films
1980s English-language films
1980s American films